The Population Registration Act of 1950 required that each inhabitant of South Africa be classified and registered in accordance with their racial characteristics as part of the system of apartheid.

Social rights, political rights, educational opportunities, and economic status were largely determined by the group to which an individual belonged. There were three basic racial classifications under the law: Black, White and Coloured (mixed). Indians (that is, South Asians from the former British India, and their descendants) were later added as a separate classification as they were seen as having "no historical right to the country".

An Office for Race Classification was set up to overview the classification process.  Classification into groups was carried out using criteria such as outer appearance, general acceptance and social standing. For example, it defined a "white person" as one who "in appearance is obviously a white person who is generally not accepted as a coloured person, or is generally accepted as a white person and is not in appearance obviously a white person." Because some aspects of the profile were of a social nature, reclassification was not uncommon, and a board was established to conduct that process. The following criteria were used for separating the coloured people from the white people:

 Characteristics of the person's head hair
 Characteristics of the person's other hair
 Skin colour
 Facial features
 Home language and especially the knowledge of Afrikaans
 Area where the person lives, the person's friends and acquaintances
 Employment
 Socioeconomic status
 Eating and drinking habits

This law worked in tandem with other laws passed as part of the apartheid system. Under the Prohibition of Mixed Marriages Act of 1949, it was illegal for a white person to marry a person of another race. With the enactment of the Immorality Amendment Act of 1950, it also became a crime for a white person and a person of another race to have sexual intercourse.

Under the act, as amended, Coloureds and Indians were formally classified into various subgroups, including Cape Coloured, Malay, Griqua, Chinese, Indian, Other Asian and Other Coloured.

The South African Parliament repealed the act on 17 June 1991. However, the racial categories defined in the act remain ingrained in South African culture and they still form the basis of some official policies and statistics aimed at redressing past economic imbalances (Black Economic Empowerment and Employment Equity).

See also
Demographics of South Africa
Pencil test
Urban apartheid

References

External links
 

Apartheid laws in South Africa
1950 in South African law